Parc Gatineau Water Aerodrome  is located on Lac des Loups, Quebec Canada and is open from May until October.

References

Registered aerodromes in Outaouais
Seaplane bases in Quebec